Panagra is a village in Cyprus, located about 23 km west of Kyrenia. De facto, it is under the control of Northern Cyprus. Its population in 2011 was 220.

References

Communities in Kyrenia District
Populated places in Girne District